The Bachelor River is a tributary of Lake Waswanipi, flowing into the Regional County Municipality (RCM) of Eeyou Istchee Baie-James, within the administrative region of Nord-du-Québec, in the province of Quebec, in Canada. The course of the river crosses the townships of Lesueur and Nelligan.

The hydrographic slope of the Bachelor River is accessible via route 113 which links Lebel-sur-Quévillon to Chibougamau. This road follows in part the valley of the Bachelor River. In addition, the Canadian National Railway serves this small valley.

The surface of the Bachelor River is usually frozen from early November to mid-May, however, safe ice circulation is generally from mid-November to mid-April.

Geography

Toponymy 
The toponym "Bachelor River" was formalized on December 5, 1968, at the Commission de toponymie du Québec, i.e. the creation of this commission

References

See also 

Rivers of Nord-du-Québec
Nottaway River drainage basin
Eeyou Istchee James Bay